McFarlane Alexander "Mac" Herewini (20 October 1939 – 21 May 2014) was a New Zealand rugby union player. A first five-eighth and fullback, Herewini represented Auckland at a provincial level, and was a member of the New Zealand national side, the All Blacks, from 1962 to 1967. In 1966, he played in all four tests against the touring British Lions. In all, he played 32 matches for the All Blacks including 10 internationals. He was part of the New Zealand team to tour Britain France and Canada in 1967 but lost his place in the test side to Earle Kirton. Some say that he was unsuited to the open running style of play favoured by All Blacks coach Fred Allen. However, Herewini continued to play for Auckland until 1970 and had New Zealand trials in 1968 and 1970. His last first class game was for New Zealand Māori against the 1971 British Lions.

Of Ngāti Tūwharetoa and Ngāti Kahungunu descent, Herewini played for New Zealand Māori from 1960 to 1971. He was a two-time recipient of the Tom French Cup for Māori rugby player of the year, in 1960 and 1963. Herewini died in 2014 and he was buried at Otahuhu Cemetery.

References

1939 births
2014 deaths
Ngāti Tūwharetoa people
Ngāti Kahungunu people
People educated at Otahuhu College
New Zealand rugby union players
New Zealand international rugby union players
Māori All Blacks players
Auckland rugby union players
Rugby union fly-halves
Rugby union fullbacks
Burials at Otahuhu Cemetery